Chelyuskin or Cheliuskin may refer to one of the following.

Semion Chelyuskin
, a 1933 Soviet ship named after Semion Chelyuskin; crushed and sunk in pack in 1933
Cape Chelyuskin